Nipon Malanont  is a Thai retired football goalkeeper who played for Thailand in the 1996 Asian Cup.

Honours

Thai Farmer Bank
 Afro-Asian Club Championship: 1994
 AFC Champions League: 1994, 1995
 Kor Royal Cup: 1991, 1992, 1993, 1995
 Thai Premier League: 2000
 Thailand FA Cup: 1999
 Queen's Cup: 1994, 1995, 1996, 1997

Thailand
 ASEAN Football Championship: 1996

Goalkeeper Coach
 2007–2010 	; Thailand
 2007–2009 	; Chula-Sinthana FC
 2009–2010 	; Muangthong United
 2011 	        ; Thai Port
 2011 	        ; Buriram
 2012-2014 	; Bangkok United
 2014–2015 	; Thailand U20
 2014–2016 	; Suphanburi
 2017	; Ratchaburi Mitr Phol
 2017–	; Bangkok Glass

External links

11v11.com

1966 births
Living people
Nipon Malanont
Association football goalkeepers
Nipon Malanont